DeCovan Kadell "Dee" Brown (born November 29, 1968) is an American retired professional basketball player who spent thirty years in the NBA including twelve seasons as a player (1990–2002) in the National Basketball Association (NBA), playing for the Boston Celtics, Toronto Raptors, and Orlando Magic, and as an executive with the Orlando Magic, Detroit Pistons, Sacramento Kings, and as Vice President of Holistic Player Performance with the Los Angeles Clippers. His daughter Lexie Brown plays for the Los Angeles Sparks of the Women's National Basketball Association (WNBA).

Playing career 

A 6'1" (1.85 m) guard from Jacksonville University, Brown was selected by the Celtics with the 19th pick of the 1990 NBA draft. He was a member of the NBA All-Rookie Team in his first year, when he played in all 82 games and averaged 8.7 points per game. One of the highlights of his career occurred in 1991, when he won the NBA Slam Dunk Contest with a no look slam dunk. He was a starter for Boston during the 1993–94 and 1994–95 seasons and posted his best scoring numbers, averaging more than 15 points per game each of those years. After seven and a half seasons with the Celtics, he was traded to the Raptors along with Chauncey Billups in 1998. Overall, during his career, he scored 6,758 total points.

Television career 

In 2005, Brown won a one-year contract as a studio analyst for ESPN as the winner of the reality show Dream Job, defeating five other former NBA players. He went on to host an ESPN show called City Slam!.

Coaching career 

In 2005, Brown established EDGE Basketball, LLC with himself as CEO. The outfit specializes in training players from middle school up to the professional ranks.

Brown has coached in the Women's National Basketball Association, first as a head coach for the Orlando Miracle and then as the head coach for the San Antonio Silver Stars.

On July 29, 2009, Brown was named as the head coach of the Springfield Armor, a team in the NBA Development League. He also became the team's Director of Basketball Operations.  In two seasons as coach of the Armor, the team finished with records of 7–43 (.140) and 13–37 (.260), for a total of 20–80 (.200).

In September 2011, Brown announced that he would be joining the Detroit Pistons as an assistant under Lawrence Frank.

On July 9, 2013, Brown joined the Sacramento Kings as an assistant coach and director of player development.

He joined the Los Angeles Clippers for the 2016–17 season and is now the general manager of their NBA G League team.

 Brown is the Director of University and Athletics Relations at his alma mater, Jacksonville University.

References

External links 

 Career stats

1968 births
Living people
African-American basketball coaches
African-American basketball players
Basketball coaches from Florida
American expatriate basketball people in Canada
Basketball players from Jacksonville, Florida
Bolles School alumni
Boston Celtics draft picks
Boston Celtics players
Connecticut Sun coaches
Detroit Pistons assistant coaches
Jacksonville Dolphins men's basketball players
National Basketball Association broadcasters
Orlando Magic players
Orlando Miracle coaches
Participants in American reality television series
Point guards
Reality show winners
Sacramento Kings assistant coaches
San Antonio Stars coaches
Shooting guards
Sportspeople from Jacksonville, Florida
Springfield Armor coaches
Toronto Raptors players
American men's basketball players
21st-century African-American people
20th-century African-American sportspeople
Women's National Basketball Association general managers